The Korea Herald is a leading English-language daily newspaper founded in 1953 and published in Seoul, South Korea. The editorial staff is composed of Korean and international writers and editors, with additional news coverage drawn from international news agencies such as the Associated Press.

The Korea Herald is operated by Herald Corporation. Herald Corporation also publishes The Herald Business, a Korean-language business daily, The Junior Herald, an English weekly for teens, The Campus Herald, a Korean-language weekly for university students. Herald Media is also active in the country's booming English as a foreign language sector, operating a chain of hagwons as well as an English village.

The Korea Herald is a member of the Asia News Network.

History

The Korean Republic

The Korea Herald began in August 1953 as The Korean Republic, a 4-page tabloid English-language daily. In 1958, The Korean Republic published its fifth anniversary issue of 84 pages, the largest ever in Korea. In 1962, The Korean Republic published its first daily educational supplement and launched the Korean Republic English Institute (the Korea Herald Language Institute).

The Korea Herald
 
Then, in 1965, The Korean Republic was renamed The Korea Herald. In 1973, The Korea Herald opened a branch office in Los Angeles, the United States. In 1975, the newspaper introduced Korea's first computerized typesetting system. In 1982, the daily international edition of The Korea Herald was launched as an 8-page tabloid.

Internet

The newspaper launched its website in 1995. In 1996, the publishing process for The Korea Herald was computerized. In 1997, the company published the official newspaper of the 18th Winter Universiad. In 1997, Korea Telecom selected The Korea Herald as the official public database partner. The first Herald School, a franchised English education center for children, opened in 2000 as the Herald Academy Inc. In August of the same year, The Korea Herald began to publish 20 pages daily. According to The Guardian in 2002, The Korea Herald had a specialty in IT and business news.

The Junior Herald

In 2004, Herald Media won the right to manage the Seoul English Village, an English language immersion school set up by the Seoul Metropolitan City government. Later that year, The Junior Herald, an English-language newspaper for preteens, was launched.

“Insight into Korea” book series

The Korea Herald launched a book series in 2007 to mark the 20th anniversary of the civilian uprising in June 1987, which put Korea on a path to democracy. The purpose of the project was to present a comprehensive analysis of Korean society's transformation during the past two decades.

The Korea Herald has thus far published eight books under this series: Insight into Korea, Social Change in Korea, Political Change in Korea, A New National Strategy for Korea, Korean Wave, Big Bang in Capital Market, Financial Industry at a Crossroads and Insight into Dokdo.

See also
List of newspapers
Media in South Korea

References

External links

Newspapers established in 1953
Newspapers published in South Korea
English-language newspapers published in South Korea
Mass media in Seoul
1953 establishments in South Korea
South Korean news websites